The BMW M8 GTE is an endurance grand tourer (GT) car constructed by the German automobile manufacturer BMW. It was developed in late 2016 and made its competitive début in IMSA WeatherTech SportsCar Championship and FIA WEC for the 2018 season, and thus marking BMW Motorsport's return to 24 Hours of Le Mans after a six-year hiatus. The M8 GTE, which replaced the ongoing BMW M6 GTLM at the end of the 2017 season, is based on the BMW M8. The car was unveiled on 12 September 2017 at the Frankfurt Motor Show, Germany.

Development
BMW began the development, design, and construction of the M8 GTE in mid-2016. The first chassis was assembled in June 2017, with the first vehicle completed in July. The M8 GTE is the first car manufactured by BMW Motorsport from the ground up as a LM GTE homologated vehicle, rather than based on an existing design.

Technical features
The BMW M8 GTE programme utilizes several cutting-edge technologies and concepts, such as Additive Manufacturing for rapid prototyping of components, as well as a transaxle, integrating the transmission, driveshaft, and axle assembly into a single unit, balancing mass front to rear.

The M8 GTE is powered by a front-mid mounted BMW n63/1 turbocharged V8 engine, the motorsport variant of the S63 motor found in roadgoing BMW models such as the F90 M5, as well as the BMW 8 Series (G15).

Competition History

2018 IMSA WeatherTech Sportscar Championship

GT Le Mans Teams Championship

GT Le Mans Manufacturers Championship

2018-19 FIA World Endurance Championship

World Endurance GTE Manufacturers' Championship

Endurance Trophy for LMGTE Pro Teams

2019 IMSA WeatherTech Sportscar Championship

GT Le Mans Teams Championship

GT Le Mans Manufacturers Championship

2020 IMSA WeatherTech Sportscar Championship

GT Le Mans Teams Championship

GT Le Mans Manufacturers Championship

2021 IMSA WeatherTech Sportscar Championship

GT Le Mans Teams Championship

GT Le Mans Manufacturers Championship

Gallery

References

External links

BMW M8 GTE profile on bmw-motorsport.com

M8 GTE
Grand tourer racing cars
24 Hours of Le Mans race cars
LM GTE cars